Darlene Marie Iskra (born 1952) is a retired United States Navy officer. Upon assuming command of the rescue and salvage ship  on December 27, 1990, she became the first woman to command a U.S. Navy vessel. She continued to serve on Guam as a liaison officer for the Commander Naval Forces Marianas. After being transferred back to the continental United States, she resigned from the Navy in 2000.

After earning her BA at San Francisco State University, she earned an MA in National Security and Strategic Studies from the Naval War College and an MA and Ph.D. in Sociology from the University of Maryland.

She wrote Women in the United States Armed Forces: A Guide to the Issues (United States, ABC-CLIO, 2010.)

References

1952 births
Living people
Place of birth missing (living people)
San Francisco State University alumni
Female United States Navy officers
Naval War College alumni
University System of Maryland alumni
21st-century American women